At least three ships of the Imperial Russian, Soviet or Russian Navy have been named Dmitri Donskoi after Dmitry Donskoy.

  - a 51-gun frigate that was stricken in 1872.
  - an armoured cruiser launched in 1883 and scuttled after the Battle of Tsushima in 1905.
  - the lead ship of the  nuclear-powered ballistic missile submarines.

Russian Navy ship names